Yuththachai Liamkrai  (Thai ยุทธิชัย เหลี่ยมไกร, born 2 June 1987) is a professional footballer from Thailand.

Honours

Club
Ayutthaya F.C.
 Regional League Division 2 Champions (1) : 2012

References

1987 births
Living people
Yuththachai Liamkrai
Association football midfielders
Yuththachai Liamkrai
Yuththachai Liamkrai
Yuththachai Liamkrai
Yuththachai Liamkrai
Yuththachai Liamkrai
Yuththachai Liamkrai